Gades may refer to:

Cádiz, a city in southwestern Spain, known as Gādēs in Latin
Antonio Gades (1936–2004), a Spanish dancer and choreographer
Hudson Valley Renegades, a minor league baseball team, nicknamed the Gades
Gades, an antagonist in the Lufia video game series 
Gwen Gades, Canadian publisher and founder of Dragon Moon Press

See also
Gade (disambiguation)
Hades (disambiguation)